Johanna Konta and Maria Sanchez were the defending champions, having won the previous edition in 2015, but Konta chose to participate in Cincinnati instead. Sanchez partnered Sílvia Soler Espinosa, but they lost in the quarterfinals to Emina Bektas and Alexa Guarachi.

Jessica Moore and Jocelyn Rae won the title after defeating Desirae Krawczyk and Giuliana Olmos 6–1, 7–5 in the final.

Seeds

Draw

References
Main Draw

Odlum Brown Vancouver Open
Vancouver Open